The Xacbal Dam (Spanish: Planta Hidroeléctrica Xacbal) is a reinforced concrete gravity dam and power plant spanning the Xacbal River in the municipality of Chajul, Guatemala.

A 10.35 m high dam diverts the river's water flow to a sand filter and on through an open conduction channel to a daily regulation reservoir located outside the river channel. A 4.7 km conduction tunnel with a diameter of 4.65 m, directs the water through a 615 m long pressure pipe (diameter 3.55 m) to the power house. The water is diverted back to the Xacbal river channel.

The plant has 2 x 47 MW Francis vertical axis turbines with an installed capacity of 94 MW. A 120 km transmission line was built to connect the power plant to the national grid. Annual power production is estimated at 486 GWh.

See also

 List of hydroelectric power stations in Guatemala

References

Hydroelectric power stations in Guatemala
Energy infrastructure completed in 2010
Dams in Guatemala
Dams completed in 2010